Çalıköy can refer to:

 Çalıköy railway station
 Çalıköy, Söke
 Çalıköy, Tavas